Gayle Broughton (born 5 June 1996) is a former New Zealand rugby union sevens player who played for the New Zealand women's national rugby sevens team. She made her international debut for New Zealand in 2014 and called time on her rugby career in March 2022. She had scored 315 points in 112 World Series matches. and has won every trophy on offer in the sevens game. Her accomplishments include six World Rugby Sevens series titles, Olympic Games gold and silver medals, Commonwealth Games gold and winning the Rugby World Cup Sevens.
  
In April 2022, Broughton began playing rugby league in Australia.

Early life
Gayle Broughton was born in Hāwera, New Zealand, on 5 June 1996 to Alfred Hauparoa.

A naturally talented sportswoman with six brothers, Broughton was raised by her Broughton grandparents but had a troubled childhood, which led to her being expelled from high school at the age of 16.

Rugby career
In 2012, the New Zealand Rugby Union organized a "Go for Gold" campaign to identify talent with the potential to represent New Zealand in the sevens competition at the Rio Olympics. 
A promise of $10 by her grandmother Patsy Broughton if she would attend the trial being held in Taranaki was sufficient to tempt Broughton to meet Patsy the morning after a party and be driven by her to what she thought would be a "dumb trial". At the trial she was put through various fitness, rugby skill and character assessment activities. She discovered that she liked the game. Of the 800 who attended a trial, Broughton along with Michaela Blyde and Lauren Bayens, who were also from Taranaki, were among the 30 most promising who attended a training camp at Waiouru in mid-2012.

Accepted for the sevens programme, Broughton initially remained in Taranaki, having to get up at 6am to train in New Plymouth alongside Blyde. However, her lack of commitment and repeated failures to turn up for training sessions resulted in her receiving two warnings from the Taranaki Rugby Union, who were supervising her training on behalf of the Sevens coaching staff. At the second warning she was informed that if she did not commit to what was expected she would be dropped. Broughton admits that at the time she did not care about the opportunity she was being given until her grandmother took her aside and urged her not sabotage this opportunity to better herself. This talk prompted Broughton to take the next day’s bus out of Taranaki and relocate to the squad’s training hub at Mount Maunganui.  Here she boarded with coach Sean Horan and his family, along with Kelly Brazier and Portia Woodman. It was her first time away from home and for the first three months she absolutely hated the experience.

At the age of 18, Broughton made her international debut for New Zealand in 2014 against Netherlands at the USA Women's Sevens. 
Later in the year, she was part of the team who won the World Cup in Moscow. She was part of the New Zealand's women's sevens squad that qualified for the Rio Olympics when they won the 2014–15 World Rugby Women's Sevens Series.

2016 Rio Olympic Games
Broughton ruptured her anterior cruciate ligament (ACL) at the Sao Paulo Sevens tournament in February 2016 and opted for a non-surgical treatment that allowed her to play without ligaments in the affected knee. She was selected as a member of the playing team for the 2016 Rio Olympics. She pledged to give her medal to her grandmother if the team won gold. The team scored 109 points and conceded 12 in pool play, before beating USA in the quarter-finals and Great Britain in the semi-finals, before losing 24–17 to Australia in the final. The loss hit the squad hard.

Broughton was a member of the New Zealand team that won gold at the 2018 Commonwealth Games on the Gold Coast. Outside of her Sevens commitments she also played on occasion for the Taranaki Whio, scoring a try and kicked seven points for them against North Harbour in September 2020 in what was the team’s first ever Farah Palmer Cup win.

2020 Tokyo Olympic Games
Broughton was selected for the New Zealand Sevens team to complete at the Tokyo Olympics held in 2021. In the semi-final, the Black Ferns Sevens faced a much-improved Fiji, who up until that time had never beaten New Zealand. With the score 17-all at full-time, the game was forced into extra time, during which Broughton who had been bought back onto the field to replace Brazier, scored the winning try. The final score in favour of the Black Ferns was 22-17. The team went on to win the final and claim the gold medal.

In early March 2022, Broughton announced that after nine years she was retiring from rugby to migrate to Australia with her family.

Rugby league career
In April 2022, Broughton began playing with Mounties in the NSWRL Women's Premiership. In early June 2022, the Parramatta Eels announced that Broughton had signed to play for the club in the 2022 NRL Women's season.

At the end of the 2022 season, Broughton was voted by the NRLW players as their Rookie of the Year in the Rugby League Players Association awards.

Awards and honours
 2021, Joint winner of Taranaki Daily News Person of the Year 2021 with Michaela Blyde.

Personal life
Of Māori descent, Broughton affiliates to the Ngāruahine and Ngāti Ruanui iwi. She is openly lesbian.

References

External links
 
 
 
 Gayle Broughton  at Black Ferns Sevens

1996 births
Living people
New Zealand female rugby union players
New Zealand international rugby union players
New Zealand female rugby sevens players
New Zealand women's international rugby sevens players
New Zealand Māori rugby union players
Rugby sevens players at the 2016 Summer Olympics
Olympic rugby sevens players of New Zealand
Ngāruahine people
Ngāti Ruanui people
Olympic silver medalists for New Zealand
Olympic medalists in rugby sevens
Medalists at the 2016 Summer Olympics
Rugby sevens players at the 2018 Commonwealth Games
Commonwealth Games rugby sevens players of New Zealand
Commonwealth Games gold medallists for New Zealand
Commonwealth Games medallists in rugby sevens
Rugby sevens players at the 2020 Summer Olympics
Medalists at the 2020 Summer Olympics
Olympic gold medalists for New Zealand
New Zealand LGBT sportspeople
LGBT rugby union players
Rugby union players from Hāwera
Medallists at the 2018 Commonwealth Games